The Linwood Formation is a geologic formation in Iowa. It preserves fossils dating back to the Devonian period.

See also

 List of fossiliferous stratigraphic units in Iowa
 Paleontology in Iowa

References
 

Devonian Iowa
Devonian southern paleotemperate deposits